HMS Strafford was a 60-gun fourth rate ship of the line of the Royal Navy, built to the 1733 proposals of the 1719 Establishment of dimensions at Chatham Dockyard, and was launched on 24 July 1735.

Engagements
HMS Strafford took part in the destruction of the fortress of San Lorenzo el Real Chagres (22-24 March 1740), in Panama, as part of a squadron commanded by Vice-Admiral Edward Vernon during the War of Jenkins' Ear.

Given the overwhelming superiority of the English forces, Captain Don Juan Carlos Gutiérrez Cevallos surrendered the fort on 24 March, after resisting for two days.

She was at the Battle of Havana in 1748.

Strafford served until 1756, when she was sunk as part of a breakwater.

Notes

References

Lavery, Brian (2003) The Ship of the Line - Volume 1: The development of the battlefleet 1650-1850. Conway Maritime Press. .

External links
 

Ships of the line of the Royal Navy
1730s ships